Metzneria portieri is a moth of the family Gelechiidae. It was described by Viette in 1948. It is found in Ethiopia.

References

Moths described in 1948
Metzneria